Simnett is a surname. Notable people with the surname include: 

Marianna Simnett (born 1986), Berlin-based artist
Mark Simnett, former member of the band Bark Psychosis
Sophie Simnett (born 1997), English actress